Scinax funereus is a species of frog in the family Hylidae.
It is found in Brazil, Ecuador, Peru, and possibly Bolivia.
Its natural habitats are subtropical or tropical moist lowland forests, intermittent freshwater marshes, rural gardens, and heavily degraded former forest.

References

funereus
Amphibians described in 1874
Taxonomy articles created by Polbot